Senator Grout may refer to:

Henry W. Grout (1858–1932), Iowa State Senate
Josiah Grout (1842–1925), Vermont State Senate
William W. Grout (1836–1902), Vermont State Senate